Marshala Koneva Street is a street in Shchukino District of North-Western Administrative Okrug of the federal city of Moscow, Russia. Raspletina Street is located to the east of it and 1-y Volokolamsky Driveway is to the west.

History

Naming
In May 28, 1973, 2-y Volokolamsky Driveway and the 3-y Oktyabrskogo Polya Street were merged to create Marshala Koneva Street, named after Ivan Konev, the Marshal of the Soviet Union.

Streets in Moscow